Hannes Martin Holm (born 26 November 1962 in Lidingö), is a Swedish director and screenwriter. He makes almost all of his films with Måns Herngren.

Selected filmography 
1983 - Interrail
1983 - Vidöppet (Wide Open) (TV-series)
1985 - Förspelet (The Fore Play) (TV-series)
1987 - Bröderna Olsson (The Olsson Brothers) (TV-series)
1990 - S*M*A*S*H (TV-series)
1995 - One in a Million (En på miljonen)
1997 - Adam & Eva
2000 - Det blir aldrig som man tänkt sig (Things Never End Up Like You've Planned)
2002 - Klassfesten (The Class Reunion)
2006 - Varannan vecka (Every Other Week)
2007 - Underbar och älskad av alla (Wonderful And Loved By Everyone)
2010 - Behind Blue Skies
2014 - Himlen är oskyldigt blå
2012 - The Anderssons in Greece
2013 - The Anderssons Hit the Road
2014 - The Anderssons Rock the Mountains
2015 - A Man Called Ove
2018 - Ted – För kärlekens skull
2021 - Sagan om Karl-Bertil Jonssons julafton

References

External links
  Svensk-filmdatabas

1962 births
Living people
Swedish film directors